Jay County Courthouse is a historic courthouse located at Portland, Jay County, Indiana.  It was built between 1915 and 1919, and is a three-story, Renaissance Revival style limestone building with a low roof behind a parapet. It is five bays by eleven bays with a rusticated exterior base and smooth upper floors and paired Ionic order engaged columns.

It was listed on the National Register of Historic Places in 1981.  It is located in the Portland Commercial Historic District.

References

County courthouses in Indiana
Courthouses on the National Register of Historic Places in Indiana
Renaissance Revival architecture in Indiana
Government buildings completed in 1919
Buildings and structures in Jay County, Indiana
National Register of Historic Places in Jay County, Indiana
Historic district contributing properties in Indiana